The 1954 Michigan Wolverines football team represented the University of Michigan in the 1954 Big Ten Conference football season. In its seventh year under head coach Bennie Oosterbaan, Michigan compiled a 6–3 record (5–2 against conference opponents), tied for second place in the Big Ten, outscored opponents by a combined total of 139 to 87, and was ranked No. 15 in the final AP and Coaches Polls.

Left guard Ted Cachey was the team captain, and fullback Fred Baer received the team's most valuable player award,

Two Michigan players received All-American honors: left end Ron Kramer was selected as a first-team All-American by the Central Press Association, and left tackle Art Walker received first-team honors from the All-America Board and the Football Writers Association of America.

The team's statistical leaders included quarterback Jim Maddock with 293 passing yards, Fred Baer with 439 rushing yards, and Ron Kramer with 303 receiving yards.

Schedule

Statistical leaders
Michigan's individual statistical leaders for the 1954 season include those listed below.

Rushing

Passing

Receiving

Kickoff returns

Punt returns

Scoring

Personnel

Letter winners
The following 33 players received varsity letters for their participation on the 1954 team. Players who started at least four games are shown with their names in bold.

Fred Baer, 5'11", 188 pounds, senior, LaGrange, IL – started 6 games at fullback
Lou Baldacci, 6'1", 196 pounds, junior, Akron, OH – started 5 games at quarterback, 1 game at fullback
 Terry Barr, 6'1", 172 pounds, sophomore, Grand Rapids, MI - halfback
James Bates, 6'0", 198 pounds, senior, Farmington, MI – started 4 games at center
Tony Branoff, 5'11", 188 pounds, junior, Flint, MI – started 2 games at right halfback
 Charles Brooks, 6'1", 202 pounds, sophomore, Marshall, MI - end
Ted Cachey, 5'10", 178 pounds, senior, Chicago – started 9 games at left guard
Daniel Cline, 5'10" 175 pounds, senior, Brockport, NY – started 9 games at left halfback
 George Corey, 5'10", 163 pounds, junior, Baden, PA - halfback
 Don Drake, 5'11", 213 pounds, senior, Ypsilanti, MI - center
 Jim Fox, 6'0", 190 pounds, junior, Saginaw, MI - guard
Ronald Geyer, 6'2", 225 pounds, senior, Toledo, OH – started 6 games at right tackle
 Jerry Goebel, 6'3", 214 pounds, sophomore, Grosse Pointe, MI - center
 Tom Hendricks, 5'11", 181 pounds, junior, Detroit - halfback
Edward Hickey, 5'8", 173 pounds, senior, Anaconda, MT – started 1 game at right halfback
Dave Hill, 6'0", 188 pounds, junior, Ypsilanti, MI – started 2 games at fullback
 Stan Knickerbocker, 5'11", 173 pounds, senior, Chelsea, MI - halfback
 Bill Kolesar, 6'0", 221 pounds, junior, Mentor, OH - tackle
Ron Kramer, 6'3", 210 pounds, sophomore, East Detroit, MI – started 9 games at left end
Jim Maddock, 6'0", 187 pounds, sophomore, Chicago – started 1 game at quarterback
Tom Maentz, 6'2", 205 pounds, sophomore, Holland, MI – started 5 games at right end
 Bob Marion, 5'10", 192 pounds, junior, Muskegon Heights, MI - guard
Duncan McDonald, 6'0", 170 pounds, senior, Flint, MI – started 3 games at quarterback
Ed Meads, 6'0", 199 pounds, junior, Oxford, MI – started 9 games at right guard
John Morrow, 6'2", 228 pounds, junior, Ann Arbor, MI – started 3 games at right tackle
John Peckham, 6'2", 227 pounds, junior, Sioux Falls, SD – started 2 games at center
 Chuck Ritter, 6'0", 195 pounds, senior, Cassopolis, MI - guard
 Mike Rotunno, 6'0", 187 pounds, sophomore, Canton, OH - guard
Ed Shannon, 5'8", 172 pounds, sophomore, River Forest, IL – started 6 games at right halfback
Gene Snider, 6'0", 195 pounds, sophomore, Hamtramck, MI – started 3 games at center
 John Veselenak, 6'2", 192 pounds, senior, Flint, MI - end
Art Walker, 5'11", 218 pounds, senior, South Haven, MI – started 9 games at left tackle
Gerry Williams, 6'2", 189 pounds, junior, Flint, MI – started 4 games at right end

Coaches and staff
Michigan's 1954 coaching, training, and support staff included the following persons.
Head coach: Bennie Oosterbaan
Assistant coaches: Jack Blott, Don Dufek, Robert Hollway, Cliff Keen, Pete Kinyon, Matt Patanelli, Don Robinson, Walter Weber, J. T. White
Trainer: Jim Hunt
Manager: Glenn Bearss

Awards and honors
Honors and awards for the 1954 season went to the following individuals.
Captain: Ted Cachey
All-Americans: Art Walker
All-Conference: Art Walker, Ron Kramer
Most Valuable Player: Fred Baer
Meyer Morton Award: Don Dugger

References

Michigan
Michigan Wolverines football seasons
Michigan Wolverines football